Tamika Saxby also known as Tamika Hunt (born 18 April 1993 in Australia) is a professional squash player who represents Australia. She reached a career-high world ranking of World No. 48 in November 2017.

References

External links 

Australian female  squash players
Living people
1993 births
Competitors at the 2017 World Games
21st-century Australian women